Ditula saturana is a species of moth of the family Tortricidae. It is found on Sardinia.

References

Moths described in 1913
Archipini